The Gdańsk astronomical clock is a fifteenth-century astronomical clock in St. Mary's Church, Gdańsk.

History and description
The clock was constructed between 1464–1470 by Hans Düringer.  Its complex dials show the time and date, phases of the moon, the position of the Moon and Sun in relation to the zodiac signs, and the calendar of saints. Adam and Eve ring the bell on the hour, and at noon a procession appears that features Adam and Eve alongside the Three Kings, the Apostles, and Death.

Due to severe damage in World War II, it was reconstructed after 1945.

References

Buildings and structures in Gdańsk
Clocks in Poland
Astronomical clocks